Because We Can was a concert tour by American rock band, Bon Jovi. The tour was in support of the band's twelfth studio album What About Now. The tour was named after the lead single from What About Now. All five major continents were visited during the 2013 tour. The tour saw the band travel to Wales for the first time in 12 years since their 2001 One Wild Night Tour and was also the first time in 18 years since their 1995 These Days Tour that the band returned to Africa for two dates in South Africa. Furthermore, the tour also saw the band travel to Cologne performing in the Müngersdorfer Stadion also for the first time in 12 years since their 2001 tour, this tour was the first time in the band's 30-year history that they visited Bulgaria and Poland. The tour ranked 1st on Pollstar's annual "Top 100 Mid Year Worldwide Tours". It earned $142.1 million from 60 shows. At the end of 2013, the tour placed 1st on Pollstar's "Top 100 Worldwide Tours", grossing $259.5 million from 102 shows.

This is the band's last tour to feature guitarist Richie Sambora, as he left the band during the initial leg and first show in Canada, informing the band via management just hours before the show took place. He would not return for the remainder of the dates.

The J. Geils Band played opening act for some shows in the summer dates.

Setlist
"That's What the Water Made Me"
"You Give Love a Bad Name"
"Raise Your Hands"
"Born to Be My Baby"
"Lost Highway"
"Whole Lot of Leavin'"
"It's My Life"
"Because We Can"
"What About Now"
"We Got It Going On"
"Keep the Faith"
"Amen"
"Bed of Roses"
"Captain Crash & The Beauty Queen From Mars"
"We Weren't Born to Follow"
"Who Says You Can't Go Home"
"I'll Sleep When I'm Dead" (with snippets of "Start Me Up" and "Jumpin' Jack Flash")
"Bad Medicine" (with snippets of "Shout" and "Old Time Rock and Roll")
Encore
"Runaway"
"Wanted Dead or Alive"
"Have a Nice Day"
"Livin' on a Prayer"
Encore 2
"Always"
Encore 3
"These Days"

Tour dates

Cancelled shows

Personnel
Band
Jon Bon Jovi – lead vocals, guitar, maracas for Keep the Faith, tambourine for Hey God
Tico Torres -  drums, percussion
David Bryan – keyboards, backing vocals 
Richie Sambora – lead guitar, backing vocals, talkbox (Last show with the band on March 17)
Hugh McDonald – bass, backing vocals
Additional musicians 
Bobby Bandiera – rhythm and lead guitar, backing vocals (Last show with the band on December 17)
Phil X – lead and rhythm guitar, backing vocals, talkbox (substitute for Richie Sambora since April 2)
Rich Scannella – drums, percussion (substitute for Tico Torres who was awaiting gall bladder surgery from September 20 to October 6)

Notes

See also 
 List of highest-grossing concert tours

References

External links

2013 concert tours
Bon Jovi concert tours